Tullycarnan may refer to:
Tullycarnan (Ardglass), a townland in Lecale Lower in County Down, Northern Ireland
Tullycarnan (Witter), a townland in Ards Upper in County Down, Northern Ireland